Julie Tavlo Petersson (born 20 October 1989) is a Danish footballer who plays as a midfielder for Danish Elitedivisionen club Brøndby. Since 2012, she has been a member of the senior Denmark national team.

Club career

In January 2014, Tavlo Petersson left Taastrup FC to sign for Brøndby IF. Tavlo Petersson's buttocks went viral in November 2014, when teammate Theresa Nielsen posted photographs to Instagram of Brøndby's dressing room celebrating a 3–2 win over rivals Fortuna Hjørring.

International career

In December 2012 Tavlo Petersson made her senior international debut as a second-half substitute for Sofie Junge Pedersen in Denmark's 5–0 win over Mexico in São Paulo, Brazil. She was not selected in national coach Kenneth Heiner-Møller's Denmark squad for UEFA Women's Euro 2013.

Personal life

Tavlo Petersson combined her football career with studies at University College Sealand and work as a teaching assistant.

References

External links

Profile at Danish Football Association (DBU) 

1989 births
Living people
Danish women's footballers
Women's association football midfielders
Brøndby IF (women) players
Denmark women's international footballers
Danish expatriate women's footballers
Danish expatriate sportspeople in Spain
Expatriate women's footballers in Spain
People from Høje-Taastrup Municipality
Sportspeople from Region Zealand
Sportspeople from the Capital Region of Denmark